Upper Scamander is a rural locality in the local government area (LGA) of Break O'Day in the North-east LGA region of Tasmania. The 2016 census recorded a population of 44 for the state suburb of Upper Scamander.

History 
Upper Scamander was gazetted as a locality in 1964. The district was originally known as Lolla, but the current name was in use by 1855. 

It is believed that the name “Scamander” was given by Surveyor-General George Frankland (also known as George Franklin) who was a scholar with an interest in Greek culture.

Geography
The Scamander River forms part of the western boundary before flowing through to the east, where it then forms part of the eastern boundary.

Road infrastructure 
Route C421 (Upper Scamander Road / Catos Road) enters from the east and runs north-west to the village, where it turns south-west and runs to the western boundary. From there it follows the western boundary to the south-west corner.

See also
 Scamander, a river god in Greek mythology.

References

Towns in Tasmania
Localities of Break O'Day Council